The Beehive Corner is a landmark in the Adelaide city centre, on the north-eastern corner of King William Street and Rundle Street, centrally placed between the railway station and the city's shopping precinct.

History
The name gained currency from "The Beehive", a draper's shop opened by Brewer and Robertson from October 1849 then J.V.B. Ryley from 1850 to 1858, followed by Israel Simmons (ca.1831 – 9 June 1893) who ran the shop until 1886, when his business, with many others, failed. According to one reference it had a beehive motif on the glass door portrayed in gold leaf. Nearby tenants included Edmund Wright the well-known architect, William Ekins the gunsmith and James Allen's printing shop. The name is even older – archivist G. H. Pitt found the name was chosen by the original owners to denote a busy trading centre.

It had been a well-known landmark for fifty years in 1895 when what is essentially the present Beehive Buildings were built for the owner, Henry Martin to replace the antiquated structure. In the new design by George Klewitz Soward, four shops had frontages on King William Street and three facing Rundle Street, each 8 ft. (2.4 m) high, with jarrah floors and plastered walls and rear access and one shop 14 ft. (5.3 m) high, all having large plate-glass windows and nickel-plated columns. It was built three storeys above the pavement, and was Gothic in character, each gable finishing with crockets and a finial, and with open balustrades between them. At the main angle an ornamental turret was corbelled out, surmounted by a gilded beehive and bee and on the shaft of the turret the words 'Beehive Corner 1895' among foliage. The piers dividing the shopfronts were of Palmer granite. Sliding shutters were fitted to the windows facing King William Street, with a handsome iron verandah made by Fulton & Co. The sills of the windows facing Rundle Street were fitted with a small iron railing. The architects were English & Soward.

In 1950 the prime corner section of the complex was sold to confectioner C. A. Haigh for his iconic shop (Haigh's Chocolates) after his leasing it for some 35 years.

The neo-Gothic facade and prominent tourelle were refurbished in 1998 by the firm of Harrold and Kite.

Place in popular culture
For over a century, "Meet you at the Beehive Corner" has been a common phrase among Adelaideans when nominating a meeting-place in the city.

Forgotten today, but once a familiar landmark, "Stump's Corner", directly across King William Street from the Beehive Corner, was an earlier rendezvous, named for Alfred Stump (1860–1925), a photographer who had a prominent sign on his studio.
"Muirhead's Corner", site of Emanuel Cohen's "Monster Clothing Palace", was diagonally opposite.

References

External links 

 I. Simmons's "The Bee Hive" ca. 1873
 Haigh's Chocolates

Landmarks in Australia
History of Adelaide
Culture of South Australia
South Australian Heritage Register